St Cross Priory was an alien priory in Newport on the Isle of Wight, England. It was founded in about 1120 by monks from the Benedictine Abbey of Tiron. It was dissolved in 1391 when the priory was ceded to Winchester College. Thereafter, the buildings were repaired and a new water mill wheel was bought. Only ruins remain. The nearby St Cross Mill is a 19th-century structure built on the foundations of the monastic mill.

References

Monasteries in the Isle of Wight
Alien priories in England
1120s establishments in England
Christian monasteries established in the 12th century
1390s disestablishments